"Kyoken" Yuji Takeuchi (born August 13, 1983) is a Japanese former professional kickboxer.

Biography
Takeuchi started combat sports with boxing and later transitioned to kickboxing after seeing the success of K-1 events.

Titles and accomplishments
Martial Arts Japan Kickboxing Federation
 2007 MAJKF Super Featherweight Champion 
 2008 WMAF Super Featherweight Champion 

Krush
 2011 krush inaugural Championship Tournament -60kg Runner-up

Kickboxing record

|- style="background:#cfc" 
| 2022-04-03 || Win ||align=left| Satoru Nariai || K-1: K'Festa 5 || Tokyo, Japan || KO (Right cross) || 2 ||2:29
|-  style="background:#fbb;"
| 2016-09-19|| Loss||align=left| Kenta Hayashi|| K-1 World GP 2016 Super Featherweight World Tournament|| Tokyo, Japan|| KO (3 Knockdowns/Left Hook) || 1 || 2:47
|-  bgcolor="#fbb"
| 2013-09-21|| Loss|| align=left| Minoru Kimura|| Krush 33|| Japan || KO (Straight Right+Left Hook) || 1 || 2:07
|-  bgcolor="#fbb"
| 2013-06-30|| Loss|| align=left| Kanongsuk Weerasakreck || MAJKF DRAGON ROAD ～ONE AND ONLY TAKE 2～|| Japan || TKO  || 3 || 2:05
|-  bgcolor="#fbb"
| 2013-05-03|| Loss|| align=left| Tatsuya Inaishi || Road to Glory Japan|| Japan || Decision (Split) || 3 || 3:00
|-  bgcolor="#cfc"
| 2013-03-20|| Win|| align=left| Shota Hayashi || Krush 27|| Tokyo, Japan || KO (Punches)|| 1 || 1:48
|-  bgcolor="#c5d2ea"
| 2013-01-13 || No Contest||align=left| Hirotaka Miyakawa || Krush Grand Prix 2013 || Tokyo, Japan ||  ||  ||
|-  bgcolor="#fbb"
| 2012-12-02 || Loss ||align=left| SHIGERU || Bigbang 11 || Tokyo, Japan || Decision (Unanimous) || 3 || 3:00
|-  bgcolor="#cfc"
| 2012-10-08 || Win ||align=left| Fumiya Osawa || Krush 23 || Tokyo, Japan || KO (Left Hook) || 3 || 1:35
|-  bgcolor="#cfc"
| 2012-07-29 || Win ||align=left| Sendit Sasiprapa || MAJKF || Japan || Ext.R Decision (Mjoarity) || 4 || 3:00
|-  bgcolor="#fbb"
| 2011-09-24 || Loss ||align=left| Naoki Ishikawa || Krush 12 || Tokyo, Japan || Decision (unanimous) || 3 || 3:00
|-  style="background:#fbb;"
| 2011-04-30|| Loss ||align=left| Hirotaka Urabe || Krush -60 kg Inaugural Championship Tournament -Triple Final Round- || Tokyo, Japan || KO (High kick)|| 1 || 1:28
|-
! style=background:white colspan=9 |
|-  style="background:#cfc;"
| 2011-04-30 || Win ||align=left| Masaaki Noiri || Krush First Generation King Tournament ~Triple Final Round~, Semi Finals || Tokyo, Japan || KO (left hook) || 3 || 1:51
|-  bgcolor="#cfc"
| 2010-12-12 || Win ||align=left| Yosuke Mizuochi || Krush Inaugural Championship Tournament ～Round.1～ || Tokyo, Japan || KO (3 Knockdowns/Left Hook) || 2 || 2:24
|-  style="background:#fbb;"
| 2010-07-05|| Loss ||align=left| Koya Urabe || K-1 WORLD MAX 2010 – 63 kg Japan Tournament Reserve Fight  || Japan || Decision (Unanimous) || 3 || 3:00
|-  bgcolor="#fbb"
| 2010-05-02 || Loss ||align=left| Yuki || K-1 World MAX 2010 –63 kg Japan Tournament, 1st round || Japan || KO (High Kick)|| 2 || 1:53
|-  bgcolor="#fbb"
| 2010-03-28 || Loss ||align=left| Chudern Chuwattana || MAJKF - Taniyama Gym 25th Anniversary - Bigbang || Tokyo, Japan || Decision (Unanimous) || 5 || 3:00
|-  style="background:#fbb;"
| 2009-11-02|| Loss ||align=left| Naoki Ishikawa || Krush Lightweight Grand Prix 2009 ～Final Round～ || Tokyo, Japan || KO (Left High Knee)|| 2 || 2:27
|-  bgcolor="#cfc"
| 2009-09-06 || Win ||align=left| Mekorlek Sor.Kingstar || MAJKF Tekken in Kimitsu || Kimitsu, Japan || KO  || 3 || 0:40
|-  bgcolor="#cfc"
| 2009-07-24 || Win ||align=left| Ryuji Kajiwara || Krush Lightweight Grand Prix 2009, Quarter Final  || Tokyo, Japan || Decision (Unanimous) || 3 || 3:00
|-  bgcolor="#cfc"
| 2009-07-24 || Win ||align=left| Ichiro Ootaka || Krush Lightweight Grand Prix 2009 〜Round.1〜 || Tokyo, Japan || KO (Right Hook) || 2 || 2:08
|-  bgcolor="#cfc"
| 2009-06-14 || Win ||align=left| Takahito Fujimaki || MAJKF - BREAK THROUGH-11 || Tokyo, Japan || Decision (Unanimous) || 3 || 3:00
|-  bgcolor="#cfc"
| 2009-05-17 || Win ||align=left| Masahiro Yamamoto || Krush.3 || Tokyo, Japan || KO (left hook) || 2 || 1:38
|-  bgcolor="#c5d2ea"
| 2009-03-22 || Draw ||align=left| Rashata || NJKF GO FOR BROKE 〜ROAD TO REAL KING III〜 || Tokyo, Japan || Decision || 5 || 3:00
|-  bgcolor="#cfc"
| 2008-12-21 || Win ||align=left| TURBΦ || MAJKF - BREAK THROUGH 8 || Tokyo, Japan || Decision (Majority) || 5 || 3:00  
|-
! style=background:white colspan=9 |
|-  bgcolor="#cfc"
| 2008-11-24 || Win ||align=left| Yokthai Sithoar || MAJKF - Tekken 6 || Tokyo, Japan || Decision (Unanimous) || 5 || 3:00
|-  bgcolor="#cfc"
| 2008-09-21 || Win ||align=left| Maki Dentoranee || MAJKF - BREAK THROUGH 6 || Tokyo, Japan || Ext.R Decision (Unanimous) || 4 || 3:00
|-  bgcolor="#fbb"
| 2008-07-04 || Loss ||align=left| Yuki || RISE 48 THE KING OF GLADIATORs’08 || Japan || Ext.R TKO (Low Kick) || 4 || 1:15
|-
! style=background:white colspan=9 |
|-  bgcolor="#cfc"
| 2008-06-15 || Win ||align=left| Pinphet Sor.Torsapon || MAJKF - BREAK THROUGH-4 || Tokyo, Japan || Decision (Unanimous) || 3 || 3:00
|-  bgcolor="#cfc"
| 2008-05-11 || Win ||align=left| Tomoaki Suehiro || R.I.S.E. 46 〜THE KING OF GLADIATORs '08〜 || Tokyo, Japan || KO (Right Cross) || 2 || 2:25
|-  bgcolor="#cfc"
| 2008-04-13 || Win ||align=left| Hideki Soga || Shin Nihon Kickboxing Association - Superkick || Tokyo, Japan || TKO (Punches) || 3 || 2:58
|-  bgcolor="#cfc"
| 2007-12-02 || Win ||align=left| Atom Yamada || MAJKF - BREAKDOWN-8 MA.KICK Matsuri CHAMPION CARNIVAL || Tokyo, Japan || TKO (Doctor Stoppage) || 4 || 1:03  
|-
! style=background:white colspan=9 |
|-  bgcolor="#cfc"
| 2007-11-11 || Win ||align=left| Hideo Sugazaki || MAJKF - Tekken 5 || Tokyo, Japan || KO (Punches) || 3 || 1:52
|-  bgcolor="#cfc"
| 2007-10-21 || Win ||align=left| TSUYOSHI || MAJKF - BREAKDOWN-7|| Tokyo, Japan || KO (Punches) || 2 || 2:48
|-  bgcolor="#cfc"
| 2007-09-30 || Win ||align=left| Hidekazu Tanaka || MAJKF - ADVANCE.1|| Chiba, Japan || KO (Punches) || 3 ||
|-  bgcolor="#cfc"
| 2007-04-06 || Win ||align=left| Kenryu || MAJKF - BREAKDOWN-3|| Tokyo, Japan || KO || 1 || 1:45
|-  bgcolor="#cfc"
| 2006-12-03 || Win ||align=left| Toshiharu Haga || MAJKF - SURPRISING 8|| Tokyo, Japan || Decision (Unanimous) || 3 || 3:00
|-  bgcolor="#c5d2ea"
| 2006-10-22 || Draw ||align=left| HANAWA || MAJKF - SURPRISING 7th|| Tokyo, Japan || Decision || 3 ||
|-  bgcolor="#cfc"
| 2004-11-21 || Win ||align=left| Kazuki Kondo || MA Nihon Kick - SUPREME-7 CHAMPION CARNIVAL|| Tokyo, Japan || Decision || 3 || 2:00
|-  bgcolor="#fbb"
| 2004-10-10 || Loss ||align=left| KING || MAJKF -ADVANCE-1|| Tokyo, Japan || Decision (Unanimous) || 3 || 3:00
|-  bgcolor="#cfc"
| 2004-07-11 || Win ||align=left| Watanabe || Shinsengumi|| Japan ||  ||  ||
|-  bgcolor="#cfc"
| 2004-06-06 || Win ||align=left| Takuya Ito || MAJKF - SUPREME-4|| Tokyo, Japan || KO || 3 || 
|-
| colspan=9 | Legend:

References

Living people
1983 births
Japanese male kickboxers